The Ultimate Collection is the eighth album released on Motown Records by the group DeBarge. The album is the second compilation of their greatest hits.  In addition to the group numbers, it also includes solo singles from El DeBarge and Bunny DeBarge.  It also includes a track from Chico DeBarge, who was never part of the family group.  Also Motown was able to get the rights to the song "Dance All Night" from their Striped Horse Records album Bad Boys for this collection. The album also contains a Dance remix of the group's popular single, "Rhythm of the Night", while also featuring a more percussive, club mix radio edited version of the group's ballad "The Heart Is Not So Smart", the latter being remixed by John Morales and Sergio Munzibai.

Track listing
 "Rhythm of the Night" (Dance Mix)
 "Time Will Reveal"
 "I Like It"
 "You Wear It Well"
 "Who's Holding Donna Now"
 "Stop! Don't Tease Me"
 "Love Me in a Special Way"
 "A Dream"
 "Talk to Me" (Chico DeBarge)
 "All This Love"
 "Love Always" (El DeBarge)
 "Who's Johnny" (El DeBarge)
 "The Heart Is Not So Smart" (Club Mix / Radio Edit)
 "Save the Best for Me (Best of Your Lovin')" (Bunny DeBarge)
 "Dance All Night"
 "Stay with Me"

Alternate versions
In 2008, DeBarge released The Definitive Collection, a repackaged version of the Ultimate Collection: both releases have the same track order and credits.

DeBarge albums
1997 greatest hits albums
Motown compilation albums